Ancylosis undulatella, the sugarbeet crown borer moth or sugarbeet crown borer, is a species of snout moth in the genus Ancylosis. It was described by James Brackenridge Clemens in 1860. It is found in North America.

References

Moths described in 1860
undulatella
Moths of North America